Derzhavin is a Russian surname. Notable people with the surname include:

Gavrila Derzhavin (1743–1816), Russian poet and statesman
Konstantin Derzhavin (1903–1956), Russian writer and critic
Mikhail Derzhavin (1936–2018), Russian actor

See also
23409 Derzhavin, a minor planet

Russian-language surnames